is the easternmost of the national highways of Japan. It connects the cities of Kushiro and Nemuro in eastern part of the island and prefecture of Hokkaido in northern Japan.

Route description
Length: 
Origin: Kushiro, Hokkaido (originates at the terminus of Route 38)
Terminus: Nemuro, Hokkaido
Major cities: Akkeshi

History
Route 44 was originally designated on 18 May 1953 as National Route 242, and this was redesignated as Route 44 when the route was promoted to a Class 1 highway.

Overlapping sections
From the origin to Kitaodori 5-chome intersection, Kushiro City: Route 38
From the origin to Kiba 3-chome intersection, Kushiro City: Route 391
From the origin to Beppo intersection, Kushiro Town: Route 272

History
18 May 1953 - Second Class National Highway 242 (from Kushiro to Nemuro)
1 April 1963 - First Class National Highway 44 (from Kushiro to Nemuro)
1 April 1965 - General National Highway 44 (from Kushiro to Nemuro)

See also

References

External links

044
Roads in Hokkaido